Dundee is an unincorporated community located in the town of Osceola, in Fond du Lac County, Wisconsin, United States. It is located on Wisconsin Highway 67 in the Kettle Moraine State Forest. The Kettle Moraine Scenic Drive runs through the community.

Dundee Mountain
The local landmark Dundee Mountain is located northeast of the community. Dundee is known for its numerous UFO sightings. Residents gather each year for a festival called "UFO Daze."

Extreme Makeover: Home Edition
In the fall of 2006, the ABC show Extreme Makeover: Home Edition traveled to Dundee to build a house for the Koepke family after Matt Koepke was diagnosed with melanoma. They built a beautiful house for the five remaining members of the family, and also renovated the nearby Dundee Mill Park.

Notable people 
Fred W. Draper, member of the Wisconsin State Assembly was born in Dundee.
Teacher and Socialist member of the State Assembly W. J. Gilboy was born on a farm near Dundee.

Images

References 

Unincorporated communities in Wisconsin
Unincorporated communities in Fond du Lac County, Wisconsin